Euxestus is a genus of well polished beetles in the family Euxestidae. There are about six described species in Euxestus.

Species
These six species belong to the genus Euxestus:
 Euxestus analis Arrow, 1926
 Euxestus erithacus (Chevrolat, 1863)
 Euxestus hypomelas Arrow, 1926
 Euxestus parkii Wollaston, 1858
 Euxestus phalacroides Wollaston, 1877
 Euxestus spec Wollaston, 1858

References

Further reading

 

Coccinelloidea genera
Articles created by Qbugbot